Shahdadpur is a city and capital of Shahdadpur  located in Sanghar District of Sindh, Pakistan.

History
According to Dr. N.A. Baloch, the former vice-chancellor of Sindh University, Mir Shahdad Khan, son of Rasheed Khan, founded Shahdadpur with the help of the Leghari administrators during 1125-1128 AH (1713-1715) as the capital of upper Sindh. In 1116 AH (1704 AD), the younger Khan was referred to as Riffat Panah, which means "His Eminence". Mir Shahdad Khan had barren lands cultivated, and provided security for its people by reducing crime. He established a system for sharing produce between owners and farmers. He had aging canals and waterways renovated and extended, and dug new canals that helped establish the settlement.

Legend of Sohni Mehar 
It is believed that originally they used to belong near Shahdadpur and their story became popular and poets of Punjab used sing this in their poems, thus they made their own version of the folk tale sohni mehar, near shahdadpur there are many places which are associated with their names.

City and people
Ethnicities in Shahdadpur include, Chachar, Rajput, Soomro , Memon, Chandio, Baloch, Qureshi, Punjabi, Marwari, Agha Pathan, Kaloi Baloch, Guryani Pathan, Noonari, Bhanbhro, Subhopoto Gujjar, Mallah, Siddiqui, Kazi, siyal, Solangi, Baloch, Bugti, Bhatti, Bhutto, Mughal, Mirza, Unar, Bughio, Kashmiri, Rind, Leghari tribe, Khaskheli, "Chohan", Nizamani, Talpur, Wassan, Abbasi, Pathan, Chandio, Dal, Sand, Lakha, Uttwani’s, Jablu Abra, Jablu’s Detha, Khosa, Surhia, Sarhandi Pir, Sindhi, Satti, Dahri, Jamali, Brohi, Magsi, Arain, Panhwar, Buriro, Yousafzai, Lashari, Rajput, Syed, Khaledi Qureshi Pir, Malik JOYO Zardari Uttwani’s hindu peoples and many Sindhi, Alakh Cotton Industries, and Punjabis communities.

Among the people living in the city, 70 percent are native Sindhi speakers; 20 percent speak Urdu, and the other 10 percent speak a different language. A significant number of Punjabi speakers also live in nearby villages. Although most of the inhabitants are Muslims, 30 percent are Hindus and 5 percent are Christians. According to the Census of 2017, the population of this city is 99,667. This is the second most populous city of Sangher District.

See also
Sanghar District
Sindh

References

External links
Official government site
 Official Website www.shahdadpur.ga

Sanghar District
Talukas of Sindh